Clydonopteron sacculana, the trumpet vine moth, is a species of snout moth. It was described by Louis Augustin Guillaume Bosc in 1800. It is found in the West Indies, Brazil and Argentina. In North America, it is found from Washington, DC to Florida, west to Missouri and Texas.

Wingspan 15–25 mm. The forewings are brownish crimson, washed with orange to the postmedial line. The costa is wavy and there is some gray shading in the subterminal area and a white dash. Adults are on wing from May to August.

The larvae feed on the seed pods of Campsis radicans. Pupation also takes place in the seed pods.

References

Chrysauginae
Moths of North America
Moths described in 1800
Taxa named by Louis Augustin Guillaume Bosc